Colrain may refer to
 Colrain, Massachusetts, a town in the United States
Colrain Center Historic District
John Colrain (1937–1984), Scottish football player and manager
Colrain Poetry Manuscript Conference, an American writers' conference

See also
Colerain (disambiguation)
Coleraine (disambiguation)